The 1997 Eagle Boys 3 Hour Bathurst Showroom Showdown as was an endurance race for "GT Production" cars. The event was staged at the Mount Panorama Circuit, Bathurst, New South Wales, Australia, on 18 October 1997.

The race was held as a support event for the 1997 Primus 1000 Classic.

The race was won by the Ross Palmer Motorsport Ferrari F355 of Gary Waldon and John Bowe.

Class structure
Entries were divided into the following classes:
 Class A: Super Cars
 Class B: High Performance Cars
 Class C: Production Cars over 2.5 litre
 Class D: Production Cars 1.8 to 2.5 litre
 Class E: Production Cars up to 1.8 litre

Results

References

Further reading
 Entry list, 1997 Official Programme, Mt. Panorama, Bathurst, 16–17 October
 Sheer Horse power, Australian Auto Action, 24–30 October 1997, pages 38–39

External links
 Bathurst News Retrieved from web.archive.org on 4 May 2009

Motorsport in Bathurst, New South Wales
Eagle Boys 3 Hour Bathurst Showroom Showdown